Jaws in Orbit is an album by saxophonist Eddie "Lockjaw" Davis with organist Shirley Scott, recorded in 1959 for the Prestige label.

Reception

The AllMusic review by Scott Yanow states: "The group that Eddie "Lockjaw" Davis led with organist Shirley Scott during the latter half of the 1950s was quite accessible and did a great deal to popularize the organ band in jazz."

Track listing 
All compositions by Eddie "Lockjaw" Davis except as indicated
 "Intermission Riff" (Ray Wetzel) - 6:24   
 "Can't Get Out of This Mood" (Frank Loesser, Jimmy McHugh) - 5:24   
 "Foxy" - 5:52   
 "Our Delight" (Tadd Dameron) - 6:21   
 "Bahia" (Ary Barroso) - 7:29   
 "Bingo Domingo" - 5:56

Personnel 
 Eddie "Lockjaw" Davis - tenor saxophone
 Shirley Scott - organ
 Steve Pulliam - trombone
 George Duvivier - bass
 Arthur Edgehill - drums

References 

Eddie "Lockjaw" Davis albums
Shirley Scott albums
1959 albums
Albums produced by Esmond Edwards
Albums recorded at Van Gelder Studio
Prestige Records albums